Humboldt, California may refer to:
 Humboldt Hill, California, a census-designated place
 Humboldt County, California